The Fallen Angel – in French, L'Ange déchu – is a painting by French artist Alexandre Cabanel. It was painted in 1847, when the artist was 24 years old, and depicts the Devil after his fall from Heaven.

The painting is part of the collection of the Musée Fabre in Montpellier, France and is not for sale.

References 

Paintings by Alexandre Cabanel